Ensigné is a commune in the Deux-Sèvres department in the Nouvelle-Aquitaine region in western France.

Geography
The surrounding countryside is densely wooded.   The village is close to the forest of Ensigné and of Aulnay.

The kindergarten and primary school have been merged with those of Asnières-en-Poitou and Paizay-le-Chapt, none of the three individual villages having a population above 300 by the start of the twenty-first century.

History
The history of the village is closely linked to that of the Knights Templar.   Ensigné contains a  Templar command post comprising fortifications, a chapel and a castle.  Today the site is privately owned: the castle itself is in a ruined condition, but two separate properties have been created from the part including the former chapel.

See also
Communes of the Deux-Sèvres department

References

Communes of Deux-Sèvres